Moscow State School 57 is a public school located in the Khamovniki District of Moscow, Russia. The school was founded in 1877 and is best known for its specialized secondary program in mathematics and its alumni.

History

Founding and School 4 (1877–1968) 

In 1877, a Russian engineer and educator, founded a realschule in Maly Znamensky Lane, which soon became one of the most progressive vocational schools in Russia.

After the October Revolution, the realschule was converted into a boarding school with courses in aesthetic arts and renamed to School 4. It became popular with the Soviet establishment, with top government officials sending their children there.

In 1936, the school was transformed again, converting back to a vocational school and acquiring the number 57 in Moscow's educational system.

Math classes and new campuses (1968–present) 

In 1968, Nikolay Konstantinov, a leading Russian educator in mathematics, established specialized math classes at the school. Konstantinov's teaching methodology still is used in these classes to this day and has been shared with other educational centers. The school started gaining prestige due to the quality of education it provided.

As of 2016, School 57 is a highly selective school with a competitive admission process. The high school offers specializations in humanities, biology, and mathematics, as well as a general track. In 2008–2013, the school merged with two other schools in different locations of the Khamovniki District of Moscow, in conformity with the recent reforms in educational policy.

Enrollment 
The school has a total enrollment of over a thousand students, entering first, eighth and ninth grade.

Admission to elementary school is competitive and based on test results of the students previously enrolled in the school's tuition-based mandatory preschool program.
In 2015, the admission committee considered over a thousand applicants for 130 positions. By maintaining good standing the students can guarantee their further education in the school's general track middle and high school. As is the tradition in many Russian schools, incoming students are split into a number of groups of 20–30 which each have their own curricula and teachers.

The admission committee considers a few hundred applicants for 20–25 places in each class.

School 57 launches two math classes each year, with four- and three-year curriculums, each admitting around 20–25 students who have demonstrated the best problem-solving abilities during the application process. The school organizes free preparatory courses that help interested students to develop said abilities. A portfolio that includes prizes from math competitions can strengthen an application.

Academics 
Students in the specialized classes receive extensive training in their areas of expertise, often covering college-level material in their junior and senior years. Graduates of the specialized classes often go on to pursue college degrees in Russia's best universities, including the Higher School of Economics, Moscow State University, and the Moscow Institute of Physics and Technology.

Mathematics classes 

Individual approach lies in the core of the specialized math classes' educational process. Teaching the specialized math classes isn't limited to faculty staff – additional instructors, many of whom are volunteering alumni, are involved in order to give every student necessary attention. Rather than having to learn the material from a textbook, students discover it through solving sequences of problems. Solutions are presented by the students to the instructors in one-on-one discussions. This method, introduced by Konstantinov, proved to be effective and was adopted by other educational institutions in both Russia and abroad, including School 179, the Independent University of Moscow and the Faculty of Mathematics at Higher School of Economics. Several School 57 teachers have also written textbooks that follow the method. The specialized curriculum includes introductory topics in linear algebra, calculus, set theory, and probability theory.

Awards and recognition

The school is consistently ranked among the top 10 Russian schools. Several teachers from the school received honorary awards, including the President's award. The school was also awarded grants by the George Soros' Open Society Foundations and the American Mathematical Society.
In 2016, fifteen students of the school received awards of the All-Russian Mathematical Olympiad.

Extracurricular activities
School 57 offers a number of free courses for middle schoolers preparing students who intend to apply to the mathematics, humanities and biology classes. The math program includes weekly problem solving sets for sixth-, seventh- and eighth-graders, some of the courses are published. The biology track includes lectures in math, biology and chemistry for eighth graders, and future humanities students study literature and history. All of the courses take place in the first, historical building of the school on Maly Znamensky Lane. The school also offers a number of clubs for students of each of its three buildings, including a chess club, film club, ceramics club, theater club (both puppet theater and drama) and a course preparing for TOEFL and IELTS standardized English tests.

Class vacations, including those involving intense work (lectures, presentations, field trips), are popular in the school, though not mandated by the administration. Math classes usually tend to have mountain hiking journeys, while humanities classes organize urban trips, focusing on cultural and historical studies. Since 1996 the school worked together with the Tauric Chersonese museum to organize volunteers from the number of students and alumni to work and learn on different archaeological sites in the area.

Open Oral Maths Olympiad
School 57 holds an annual math competition for sixth and seventh graders from Moscow schools, sometimes accommodating more than 300 students. During the competition, students interact with professors, as well as mathematics graduate and postgraduate students of Moscow universities. The competition consists of two rounds and a series of lectures on various subjects by school teachers and alumni professors.

Summer Мath Сamp
Since 2012, the school has been hosting a mathematical summer camp for high school students, where university professors offer a number of introductory courses in different areas of college level mathematics. School 57 students are admitted automatically, students of other Moscow schools receive a spot in the camp based on results of a competition. The Summer Мath Сamp is jointly organized by the school, the Higher School of Economics and Yandex. In 2016, the Summer Мath Сamp had 15 courses and 80 students. The topics covered in the camp's course include the Young tableau, knot invariants and Schubert polynomials. Students who have the School 57 math camp's honors certificate have a better chance at getting into the Higher School of Economics.

Lectorium
In September 2016, a series of lectures by notable alumni was launched in a joint effort by the school's alumni and students' parents. Lectures take place in all three buildings of the school, the speakers include  and Anatoly Starostin. Lectures vary in format from oral presentations to interactive master classes.

Traditions
School 57 has a tradition of keeping in touch with its alumni. Every 1st Saturday of February, the school celebrates its birthday, and current students arrange entertainment for the alumni, including refreshments, skits, and games, including . The alumni, in turn, come up with intellectual contests for students.

Logo 
Classical School 57 logo contains a mathematical root symbol hidden in its counterform. While the idea of the square root in the school icon existed before, the classical logo was originally designed by the school's students within a logo tender, organized by students in 1984 without the administration involvement. The final classical logo contains elements of work of Misha Ovchinnikov, Nikolai Grigoriev, and Alexander Kulakov. It was used with minor modifications in school collateral materials and graduation pins over decades.

The new logo was designed in 2019 as a part of school style update project.

Controversies
In August 2016, several school graduates publicly accused two school teachers of sexual misconduct and the school administration of deliberate concealment of these misconducts. This scandal led to the retirement of the principal Sergey Mendelevich. The school is still undergoing legal investigation as of November 2016.

Notable people

Alumni 
Among the notable alumni, most work in the field of mathematics. However, the list also contains well-known scholars in other disciplines, as well as politicians, businessmen, and public figures.

  (born 1975), film director, screenwriter and producer.
  (1953–2007), poet, songwriter, author of songs for Alla Pugacheva and Mashina Vremeni
 Valentin Baryshnikov, editor of Radio Free Europe/Radio Liberty
 Roman Bezrukavnikov (born 1973), mathematician, professor at the Massachusetts Institute of Technology 
  (born 1961), mathematician
 Alexandre Bouzdine (born 1954), theoretical physicist in the field of superconductivity and condensed matter physics, professor at the University of Bordeaux
Grigory Bubnov (born 1970), economist, president of Moscow Technological Institute
 Dmitry Dolgopyat (born 1972), mathematician, professor at the University of Maryland, College Park 
 Olga Igonkina (1973-2019), particle physicist, scientist at NIKHEF and professor at Nijmegen University
  (born 1953), interpreter, winner of the Andrei Bely Prize
  (born 1963), director of the Zoological Museum of Moscow University
 Mikhail Kapranov (born 1961), mathematician, professor at Yale University
 Tatyana Kasatkina (born 1963) philosopher, philologist
 Anna Kashina, writer, author of The Princess of Dhagabad
  (born 1969), historian, art critic, professor of Moscow State University
 Mikhail Khovanov (born 1972), mathematician, inventor of Khovanov homology, professor at Columbia University
  (born 1975), publicist, political figure
  (born 1976), public figure, interpreter, journalist 
  (1918–1995) philologist, professor of Moscow State University
 Alexander Kuznetsov (born 1973), mathematician, professor at the National Research University – Higher School of Economics
 Artemy Lebedev (born 1976), designer, founder of the design company Art. Lebedev Studio
  (born 1972), a four time world champion in What? Where? When?
 Ernst Lissner  (1874–1941), painter
  (born 1963), biochemist, president of Russian National Research Medical University
 Vladimir Matetsky (born 1952), composer and producer
 Alexander Mezhirov (1923–2009), poet
 Roman Mints (born 1976), violinist
 Petr Mitrichev (born 1985), competitive programmer
 Maksim Moshkow (born 1966), public figure
 Vadim Moshkovich (born 1967), businessman and philanthropist
  (born 1955), mathematician, professor of Aix-Marseille University
 Nikita Nekrasov (born 1973), physicist, professor at Stony Brook University
 Igor Pak (born 1971), mathematician, professor at the University of California, Los Angeles
  (born 1960), economist
  (born 1974), mathematician, professor of the Université de Montréal
 Leonid Reyzin, computer scientist, professor at Boston University
 Valery Rubakov (born 1955), physicist 
  (born 1978), poet, winner of the Andrei Bely Prize
 Vera Serganova (born 1961), mathematician, professor at the University of California, Berkeley
 Konstantin Sonin (born 1972), economist, professor at the University of Chicago
 Georgiy Starostin (born 1976), linguist
 (born 1976), poet, philologist, interpreter
  (born 1977), businessman, creator of Rutube
 Misha Verbitsky (born 1969), mathematician, professor at IMPA in Rio de Janeiro.
 Mikhail Voloshin (born 1953), theoretical physicist, professor at the William I. Fine Theoretical Physics Institute
 Boris Zakhoder (1918–2000), poet and children's writer
  (born 1972), author
 Anton Zorich (born 1962), mathematician, professor at the Institut de mathématiques de Jussieu – Paris Rive Gauche

Faculty 

Former faculty includes poet and novelist Igor Vishnevetsky, mathematician and Soviet dissident Tatyana Velikanova, biologist, founder of the biological classes at School 57 and other Moscow schools .

References

External links 
 
 Litvinova D. Sexual Assault Scandal Hits Elite Moscow School, Rocks Russian Intelligentsia — The Moscow Times. September 7, 2016

1877 establishments in the Russian Empire
Educational institutions established in 1877
Khamovniki District
Schools in Moscow
State schools